WSHV is an urban oldies radio station licensed to South Hill, Virginia, serving South Hill and Mecklenburg County, Virginia.  WSHV is owned and operated by Thomas Birch's Birch Broadcasting Corporation, through licensee Lakes Media, LLC.

Format flips
On August 3, 2013, WSHV and its translator W244CP 96.7 flipped to Classic Country as "Country Legends 96.7".

On June 1, 2015, WSHV changed its format to a contemporary Christian format, branded as "96.7 Shine FM".

On July 3, 2020, WSHV changed their format from contemporary Christian to urban oldies.

Translator
In addition to the main station, WSHV is relayed by an FM translator to widen its broadcast area.

References

External links

SHV
Radio stations established in 1953
Urban oldies radio stations in the United States